|}

The Baring Bingham Novices' Hurdle (known as the Ballymore Novices' Hurdle for sponsorship reasons) is a Grade 1 National Hunt hurdle race in Great Britain which is open to horses aged four years or older. It is run on the Old Course at Cheltenham over a distance of about 2 miles and 5 furlongs (4,225 metres), and during its running there are ten hurdles to be jumped. The race is for novice hurdlers, and it is scheduled to take place each year during the Cheltenham Festival in March.

History
The event was established in 1971, and it was initially called the Aldsworth Hurdle. The insurance company Sun Alliance (later Royal & SunAlliance) began sponsoring the race in 1974, and it became known as the Sun Alliance Novices' Hurdle. This association continued until 2006, and for the following three years the event was backed by Ballymore Properties.

There were high winds on the day of the planned running in 2008, so the Ballymore Properties Novices' Hurdle was rescheduled and run on Cheltenham's New Course. A new sponsor, Neptune Investment Management, began supporting the race in 2010. Ballymore resumed sponsorship from the 2018 running.

The registered (non-sponsored) title of the race is now the Baring Bingham Novices' Hurdle. This is in honour of Baring Bingham, a developer who purchased Prestbury Park in 1898, and organised the first Cheltenham Festival in 1902.

Records
Leading jockey (4 wins):
 Ruby Walsh – Fiveforthree (2008), Mikael d'Haguenet (2009), Faugheen (2014), Yorkhill (2016)

Leading trainer (6 wins):
Willie Mullins – Fiveforthree (2008), Mikael d'Haguenet (2009), Faugheen (2014), Yorkhill (2016), Sir Gerhard (2022), Impaire Et Passe (2023)

Winners

See also
 Horse racing in Great Britain
 List of British National Hunt races

References

 Racing Post:

 cheltenham.co.uk – Media information pack (2010).
 pedigreequery.com – Baring Bingham Novices' Hurdle – Cheltenham.

External links
 Race Recordings 

National Hunt races in Great Britain
Cheltenham Racecourse
National Hunt hurdle races
Recurring sporting events established in 1971
1971 establishments in England